Me Plus One may refer to:
 "Me Plus One" (Kasabian song)
 "Me Plus One" (Annie song)